Joseph Anderson (31 January 1878 — 10 June 1961) was a Scottish first-class cricketer and sports outfitter.

Anderson was born at Perth in January 1878. A club cricketer for Perthshire County Cricket Club, he made his debut in first-class cricket for Scotland against the touring West Indians at Edinburgh in 1906, with his next appearance coming against the touring Australians in 1909. He played two first-class matches against Ireland in 1909 and 1910, before making his final first-class appearance at Perth in 1912 against the touring Australians. Anderson scored 139 runs in his five first-class matches at an average of 15.44, with a highest score of 31 which came against Ireland in 1909. By profession, Anderson was a sports outfitter. Between 1904 and 1914, he produced the annual Scottish cricket annual from his outfitting business. Anderson died at Perth in June 1961.

References

External links
 

1878 births
1961 deaths
People from Perth, Scotland
Scottish cricketers
Cricket historians and writers